Agnes Marie Constanze von Hartmann (7 January 1844 – 8 May 1877) was a German writer and philosopher, known for her 1873 book Pessimism and Its Opponents and its contribution to the pessimism controversy in Germany.

Biography 
Taubert was born in 1844, in Stralsund. She was the daughter of an artillery colonel, who was friends with the father of the philosopher Eduard von Hartmann. In 1872, Taubert married Von Hartmann in Berlin-Charlottenburg and had a child with him.

Taubert was a staunch supporter of her husband's work Philosophy of the Unconscious (1869) and wrote two books which both critiqued and defended his ideas, under the pen name A. Taubert. Her work Pessimism and Its Opponents (1873) was a major influence on the pessimism controversy in Germany. In the text, she defined the problem that philosophical pessimism engages with as "a matter of measuring the eudaimonological value of life in order to determine whether existence is preferable to non-existence or not"; like her husband, Taubert argued that the answer to this problem is "empirically ascertainable". 

Taubert died in 1877, of "an attack of a rheumatism of the joints", which was described as "extremely painful".

Legacy 
Taubert has been described as "one of the first women to have a prominent role in a public intellectual debate in Germany" and has been compared to Olga Plümacher, a contemporary woman philosopher, who also had a significant role in the pessimism controversy, as well as the German-American philosopher Amalie J. Hathaway.

Works

References

Further reading 
  pp. 77–79

1844 births
1877 deaths
19th-century German philosophers
19th-century German women writers
German women non-fiction writers
German women philosophers
People from Stralsund
Philosophers of pessimism
Pseudonymous women writers
19th-century pseudonymous writers